

Arthropods

Newly named Insecta

Conodonts

Anapsids

Newly named mesosaurs

Dinosaurs

Newly named dinosaurs
Data courtesy of George Olshevsky's dinosaur genera list.

Newly named birds

References

 
Paleontology